The Name of the Rose is the 1980 debut novel by Italian author Umberto Eco. It is a historical murder mystery set in an Italian monastery in the year 1327, and an intellectual mystery combining semiotics in fiction, biblical analysis, medieval studies, and literary theory. It was translated into English by William Weaver in 1983.

The novel has sold over 50 million copies worldwide, becoming one of the best-selling books ever published.

Plot summary 
In 1327, Franciscan friar William of Baskerville and Adso of Melk, a Benedictine novice travelling under his protection, arrive at a Benedictine monastery in Northern Italy to attend a theological disputation. This abbey is being used as neutral ground in a dispute between Pope John XXII and the Franciscans, who are suspected of heresy.

The monastery is disturbed by the death of Adelmo of Otranto, an illuminator revered for his illustrations. Adelmo was skilled at comical artwork, especially concerning religious matters. William is asked by the monastery's abbot, Abo of Fossanova, to investigate the death: During his enquiry he has a debate with one of the oldest monks in the abbey, Jorge of Burgos, about the theological meaning of laughter, which Jorge despises.

The next day, a scholar of Aristotle and translator of Greek and Arabic, Venantius of Salvemec, is found dead in a vat of pig's blood. Severinus of Sankt Wendel, the herbalist, tells William that Venantius's body had black stains on the tongue and fingers, which suggests poison. Benno of Uppsala, a rhetoric scholar, reveals to William that the librarian, Malachi of Hildesheim, and his assistant Berengar of Arundel, had a homosexual relationship, until Berengar seduced Adelmo, who committed suicide out of conflicting religious shame. The only other monks who knew about the indiscretions were Jorge and Venantius. In spite of Malachi prohibiting William and Adso from entering the labyrinthine library, they penetrate the labyrinth, discovering that there must be a hidden room, entitled the finis Africae after the presumed geographical edge of the world. They find a book on Venantius' desk along with some cryptic notes. Someone snatches the book, and they pursue to no avail.

By the day after, Berengar has gone missing, which puts pressure on William. William learns of how Salvatore of Montferrat, and Remigio of Varagine, two cellarer monks, had a history with the Dulcinian heretics. Adso returns to the library alone in the evening. When leaving the library through the kitchen, Adso is seduced by a peasant girl, with whom he has his first sexual experience. After confessing to William, Adso is absolved, although he still feels guilty.

On the fourth day, Berengar is found drowned in a bath, with his fingers and tongue bearing stains similar to those found on Venantius. Bernard Gui, a member of the Inquisition, arrives to search for the murderer via papal decree. Gui arrests the peasant girl Adso loved, as well as Salvatore, accusing them both of heresy and witchcraft after finding them with Salvatore's amateurish love-spell (eggs, a black cat, and a chicken).

During the theological disputation the next day, Severinus, after obtaining a "strange" book, is found dead in his laboratory (struck on the head by a heavy armillary sphere), prompting William and Adso to search for the book. They find it, but do not recognize it; instead it is taken by Benno, who then agrees to Malachi's request that he become Assistant Librarian. Remigio and Malachi are both witnesses of Severinus' death. Remigio is interrogated in a court setting by Gui, who is able to force him to reveal a heretical past, and then to falsely confess to the crimes of the Abbey under threat of torture. Remigio, Salvatore, and the peasant girl are taken away and assumed to be doomed. In response to the recent tragedies in the abbey, Jorge leads a sermon about the coming of the Antichrist.

Malachi, near death, returns to the early sermon on the sixth day, and his final words concern scorpions. Nicholas of Morimondo, the glazier, tells William that whoever is the librarian would then become the Abbot, and with new light, William goes to the library to search for evidence. The Abbot is distraught that William has not solved the crime, and that the Inquisition is undermining him, so he dismisses William. That night, William and Adso penetrate the library once more and enter the finis Africae by solving its etymological riddle by chance.

William and Adso discover Jorge waiting for them in the forbidden room. He confesses that he has been masterminding the Abbey for decades, and his last victim is the Abbot himself, who has been trapped to suffocate inside a second passage to the chamber. William asks Jorge for the second book of Aristotle's Poetics, which Jorge gladly offers. While flipping through the pages, which speak of the virtues of laughter, William deduces that Jorge - unable to destroy this last copy of the book - laced the pages with arsenic, assuming correctly that a reader would have to lick his fingers to turn them. Furthermore, William concludes that Venantius was translating the book as he succumbed to the poison. Berengar found him and, fearing exposure, disposed of the body in pig's blood before claiming the book and dying in the baths. Malachi was coaxed by Jorge to retrieve it from Severinus' storage, where Berengar had displaced it, so he killed Severinus, retrieved the book and died after investigating its contents. Jorge confirms William's deductions and justifies this unlikely course of actions as part of a divine plan.

The deaths correspond in order and symbolism with the Seven Trumpets, which call for objects falling from the sky (Adelmo's jump from a tower), pools of blood (Venantius), poison from water (Berengar), bashing of the stars (Severinus' head was crushed with a celestial orb), scorpions (which a delirious Malachi referred to), locusts and fire. This sequence, interpreted throughout the plot (to the verge of being accepted by William himself) as the deliberate work of a serial killer, was in fact the random result of Jorge's scheme. He consumes the book's poisoned pages and uses Adso's lantern to start a fire, which kills him, burns down the library, and then spreads to destroy the abbey as a whole. Adso summons the monks in a futile attempt to extinguish the fire. As the fire spreads to the rest of the abbey, William laments his failure. Confused and defeated, William and Adso escape the abbey. Years later, Adso, now aged, returns to the ruins of the abbey and salvages any remaining book scraps and fragments from the fire, eventually creating a lesser library.

Characters 
 Primary characters
 William of Baskerville – main protagonist, a Franciscan friar
 Adso of Melk – narrator, Benedictine novice accompanying William

 At the monastery
 Abo of Fossanova – the abbot of the Benedictine monastery
 Severinus of Sankt Wendel – herbalist who helps William
 Malachi of Hildesheim – librarian
 Berengar of Arundel – assistant librarian
 Adelmo of Otranto – illuminator, novice
 Venantius of Salvemec – translator of manuscripts
 Benno of Uppsala – student of rhetoric
 Alinardo of Grottaferrata – eldest monk
 Jorge of Burgos – elderly blind monk
 Remigio of Varagine – cellarer
 Salvatore of Montferrat – monk, associate of Remigio
 Nicholas of Morimondo – glazier
 Aymaro of Alessandria – gossipy, sneering monk
 Pacificus of Tivoli
 Peter of Sant’Albano
 Waldo of Hereford
 Magnus of Iona
 Patrick of Clonmacnois
 Rabano of Toledo

 Outsiders
 Ubertino of Casale – Franciscan friar in exile, friend of William
 Michael of Cesena – Minister General of the Franciscans
 Bernard Gui – Inquisitor
 Bertrand del Poggetto – Cardinal and leader of the Papal legation
 Jerome of Kaffa (Jerome of Catalonia aka Hieronymus Catalani) – Bishop of Kaffa
 Peasant girl from the village below the monastery

Major themes 
Eco was a professor of semiotics, and employed techniques of metanarrative, partial fictionalization, and linguistic ambiguity to create a world enriched by layers of meaning. The solution to the central murder mystery hinges on the contents of Aristotle's book on Comedy, which has been lost. In spite of this, Eco speculates on the content and has the characters react to it. Through the motif of this lost and possibly suppressed book which might have aestheticized the farcical, the unheroic and the skeptical, Eco also makes an ironically slanted plea for tolerance and against dogmatic or self-sufficient metaphysical truths — an angle which reaches the surface in the final chapters. In this regard, the conclusion mimics a novel of ideas, with William representing rationality, investigation, logical deduction, empiricism and also the beauty of the human minds, against Jorge's dogmatism, censoriousness, and pursuit of keeping, no matter the cost, the secrets of the library closed and hidden to the outside world, including the other monks of the Abbey.

The Name of the Rose has been described as a work of postmodernism. The quote in the novel, "books always speak of other books, and every story tells a story that has already been told", refers to a postmodern idea that all texts perpetually refer to other texts, rather than external reality, while also harkening back to the medieval notion that citation and quotation of books was inherently necessary to write new stories. The novel ends with irony: as Eco explains in his Postscript to the Name of the Rose, "very little is discovered and the detective is defeated." After unraveling the central mystery in part through coincidence and error, William of Baskerville concludes in fatigue that there "was no pattern." Thus Eco turns the modernist quest for finality, certainty and meaning on its head, leaving the nominal plot, that of a detective story broken, the series of deaths following a chaotic pattern of multiple causes, accident, and arguably without inherent meaning.

== The aedificium'''s labyrinth ==
The mystery revolves around the abbey library, situated in a fortified tower—the aedificium. This structure has three floors—the ground floor contains the kitchen and refectory, the first floor a scriptorium, and the top floor is occupied by the library. The two lower floors are open to all, while only the librarian may enter the last. A catalogue of books is kept in the scriptorium, where manuscripts are read and copied. A monk who wishes to read a book would send a request to the librarian, who, if he thought the request justified, would bring it to the scriptorium. Finally, the library is in the form of a labyrinth, whose secret only the librarian and the assistant librarian know.

The aedificium has four towers at the four cardinal points, and the top floor of each has seven rooms on the outside, surrounding a central room. There are another eight rooms on the outer walls, and sixteen rooms in the centre of the maze. Thus, the library has a total of fifty-six rooms. Each room has a scroll containing a verse from the Book of Revelation. The first letter of the verse is the letter corresponding to that room. The letters of adjacent rooms, read together, give the name of a region (e.g. Hibernia in the West tower), and those rooms contain books from that region. The geographical regions are:
[[File:Labyrinthus Aedificium.svg|thumb|The aedificiums labyrinth]]
 Fons Adae, 'The earthly paradise' contains Bibles and commentaries, East Tower
 Acaia, Greece, Northeast
 Iudaea, Judea, East
 Aegyptus, Egypt, Southeast
 Leones, 'South' contains books from Africa, South Tower
 Yspania, Spain, Southwest outer
 Roma, Italy, Southwest inner
 Hibernia, Ireland, West Tower
 Gallia, France, Northwest
 Germania, Germany, North
 Anglia, England, North Tower
Two rooms have no lettering - the easternmost room, which has an altar, and the central room on the south tower, the so-called finis Africae, which contains the most heavily guarded books, and can only be entered through a secret door. The entrance to the library is in the central room of the east tower, which is connected to the scriptorium by a staircase.

 Title 
Much attention has been paid to the mystery of what the book's title refers to. In fact, Eco has stated that his intention was to find a "totally neutral title". In one version of the story, when he had finished writing the novel, Eco hurriedly suggested some ten names for it and asked a few of his friends to choose one. They chose The Name of the Rose. In another version of the story, Eco had wanted the neutral title Adso of Melk, but that was vetoed by his publisher, and then the title The Name of the Rose "came to me virtually by chance." In the Postscript to the Name of the Rose, Eco claims to have chosen the title "because the rose is a symbolic figure so rich in meanings that by now it hardly has any meaning left".

The book's last line, "" translates as: "the rose of old remains only in its name; we possess naked names." The general sense, as Eco pointed out, was that from the beauty of the past, now disappeared, we hold only the name. In this novel, the lost "rose" could be seen as Aristotle's book on comedy (now forever lost), the exquisite library now destroyed, or the beautiful peasant girl now dead.

This text has also been translated as "Yesterday's rose stands only in name, we hold only empty names." This line is a verse by twelfth century monk Bernard of Cluny (also known as Bernard of Morlaix). Medieval manuscripts of this line are not in agreement: Eco quotes one Medieval variant verbatim, but Eco was not aware at the time of the text more commonly printed in modern editions, in which the reference is to Rome (Roma), not to a rose (rosa). The alternative text, with its context, runs: Nunc ubi Regulus aut ubi Romulus aut ubi Remus? / Stat Roma pristina nomine, nomina nuda tenemus. This translates as "Where now is Regulus, or Romulus, or Remus? / Primordial Rome abides only in its name; we hold only naked names."

The title may also be an allusion to the nominalist position in the problem of universals, taken by William of Ockham. According to nominalism, universals are bare names: there is not a universal rose, only the name rose.

A further possible inspiration for the title may be a poem by the Mexican poet and mystic Sor Juana Inés de la Cruz (1651–1695):
Rosa que al prado, encarnada,
te ostentas presuntuosa
de grana y carmín bañada:
campa lozana y gustosa;
pero no, que siendo hermosa
también serás desdichada.

This poem appears in Eco's Postscript to the Name of the Rose, and is translated into English in "Note 1" of that book as:

Red rose growing in the meadow,
bravely you vaunt thyself
in crimson and carmine bathed:
displayed in rich and growing state.
But no: as precious as thou may seem,
Not happy soon thou shall be.

 Allusions 

 To other works 
The name of the central character, William of Baskerville, alludes both to the fictional detective Sherlock Holmes (compare The Hound of the Baskervilles – also, Adso's description of William in the beginning of the book resembles, almost word for word, Dr. Watson's description of Sherlock Holmes when he first makes his acquaintance in A Study in Scarlet) and to William of Ockham (see the next section). The name of the narrator, his apprentice Adso of Melk is among other things a pun on Simplicio from Galileo Galilei's Dialogue; Adso deriving from "ad Simplicio" ("to Simplicio"). Adso's putative place of origin, Melk, is the site of a famous medieval library, at Melk Abbey. And his name echoes the narrator of the Sherlock Holmes stories, Watson (omitting the first and last letters, with "t" and "d" being phonetically similar).

The blind librarian Jorge of Burgos is a nod to Argentinian writer Jorge Luis Borges, a major influence on Eco. Borges was blind during his later years and was also director of Argentina's national library; his short story "The Library of Babel" is an inspiration for the secret library in Eco's book. Another of Borges's stories, "The Secret Miracle", features a blind librarian. In addition, a number of other themes drawn from various of Borges's works are used throughout The Name of the Rose: labyrinths, mirrors, sects and obscure manuscripts and books.

The ending also owes a debt to Borges' short story "Death and the Compass", in which a detective proposes a theory for the behaviour of a murderer. The murderer learns of the theory and uses it to trap the detective. In The Name of the Rose, the librarian Jorge uses William's belief that the murders are based on the Revelation to John to misdirect William, though in Eco's tale, the detective succeeds in solving the crime.

The "poisoned page" motif may have been inspired by Alexandre Dumas' novel La Reine Margot (1845). It was also used in the film Il giovedì (1963) by Italian director Dino Risi. A similar story is associated with the Chinese erotic novel Jin Ping Mei, translated as The Golden Lotus or The Plum in the Golden Vase.

Eco seems also to have been aware of Rudyard Kipling's short story "The Eye of Allah", which touches on many of the same themes, like optics, manuscript illumination, music, medicine, priestly authority and the Church's attitude to scientific discovery and independent thought, and which also includes a character named John of Burgos.

Eco was also inspired by the 19th century Italian novelist Alessandro Manzoni, citing The Betrothed as an example of the specific type of historical novel he purposed to create, in which some of the characters may be made up, but their motivations and actions remain authentic to the period and render history more comprehensible.

Throughout the book, there are Latin quotes, authentic and apocryphal. There are also discussions of the philosophy of Aristotle and of a variety of millenarist heresies, especially those associated with the fraticelli. Numerous other philosophers are referenced throughout the book, often anachronistically, including Wittgenstein.

 To actual history and geography 

William of Ockham, who lived during the time at which the novel is set, first put forward the principle known as Ockham's Razor, often summarized as the dictum that one should always accept as most likely the simplest explanation that accounts for all the facts (a method used by William of Baskerville in the novel).

The book describes monastic life in the 14th century. The action takes place at a Benedictine abbey during the controversy surrounding the doctrines about  absolute poverty of Christ and apostolic poverty between branches of Franciscans and Dominicans; (see renewed controversy on the question of poverty). The setting was inspired by monumental Saint Michael's Abbey in Susa Valley, Piedmont and visited by Umberto Eco. The Spirituals abhor wealth, bordering on the Apostolics or Dulcinian heresy. The book highlights this tension that existed within Christianity during the medieval era: the Spirituals, one faction within the Franciscan order, demanded that the Church should abandon all wealth, and some heretical sects began killing the well-to-do, while the majority of the Franciscans and the clergy took to a broader interpretation of the gospel. Also in the background is the conflict between Louis IV and Pope John XXII, with the Emperor supporting the Spirituals and the Pope condemning them.

A number of the characters, such as Bernard Gui, Ubertino of Casale and the Minorite Michael of Cesena, are historical figures, though Eco's characterization of them is not always historically accurate. His portrayal of Gui in particular has been widely criticized by historians as an exaggerated caricature; Edward Peters has stated that the character is "rather more sinister and notorious ... than [Gui] ever was historically", and he and others have argued that the character is actually based on the grotesque portrayals of inquisitors and Catholic prelates more broadly in eighteenth and nineteenth-century Gothic literature, such as Matthew Gregory Lewis's The Monk (1796).' Additionally, part of the novel's dialogue is derived from Gui's inquisitor's manual, the Practica Inquisitionis Heretice Pravitatis. In the inquisition scene, the character of Gui asks the cellarer Remigius,  "What do you believe?", to which Remigius replies, "What do you believe, my Lord?" Gui responds, "I believe in all that the Creed teaches," and Remigius tells him, "So I believe, my Lord." Bernard then points out that Remigius is not claiming to believe in the Creed, but to believe that he, Gui, believes in the Creed; this is a paraphrased example from Gui's inquisitor's manual, used to warn inquisitors of the manipulative tendencies of heretics.

Adso's description of the portal of the monastery is recognizably that of the portal of the church at Moissac, France. Dante Alighieri and his Comedy are mentioned once in passing. There is also a quick reference to a famous "Umberto of Bologna" – Umberto Eco himself.

 Adaptations 
 Dramatic works 
 A play adaptation by Grigore Gonţa premiered at National Theatre Bucharest in 1998, starring Radu Beligan, Gheorghe Dinică, and Ion Cojar.
 A two-part radio drama based on the novel and adapted by Chris Dolan was broadcast on BBC Radio 4 on June 16 and 23, 2006.

 Films 
 A film adaptation, eponymously titled The Name of the Rose (1986), was directed by Jean-Jacques Annaud, and stars Sean Connery as William of Baskerville and Christian Slater as Adso.

 Games 
 A Spanish video game adaptation was released in 1987 under the title La Abadía del Crimen (The Abbey of Crime).
 Nomen Rosae (1988), a Spanish ZX Spectrum maze video game developed by Cocasoft and published by MicroHobby. It only depicts the abbey's library of the novel.
 Il Noma della Rosa [sic] (1993) is a Slovak ZX Spectrum adventure video game developed by Orion Software and published by Perpetum.
 Mystery of the Abbey is a board game inspired by the novel, designed by Bruno Faidutti and Serge Laget.
 Ravensburger published an eponymous board game in 2008, designed by Stefan Feld, based on the events of the book.
 Murder in the Abbey (2008), an adventure video game loosely based upon the novel, was developed by Alcachofa Soft and published by DreamCatcher Interactive.
 La Abadía del Crimen Extensum (The Abbey of Crime Extensum), a free remake of La Abadía del Crimen written in Java, was released on Steam in 2016 with English-, French-, Italian-, and Spanish-language versions. This remake greatly enhances the gameplay of the original, while also expanding the story and the cast of characters, borrowing elements from the movie and book. The game is dedicated to Umberto Eco, who died in 2016, and Paco Menéndez, the programmer of the original game.
 The novel and original film provided inspiration for aspects of Thief: The Dark Project, and a full mission in its expansion Thief Gold, specifically, monastic orders and the design of the aedificium.  Additionally, in the games' level editor DromEd, the intentionally ugly default texture was given the name "Jorge".
The 2022 game Pentiment, which also involves a murder-mystery set in and around a medieval monastery, draws heavily from the novel, as confirmed by director Josh Sawyer and cited in the end-game credits.

 Music 
 Dutch multi-instrumentalist Arjen Anthony Lucassen released the song "The Abbey of Synn"  on his album Actual Fantasy (1996). Lyrics are direct references to the story.
 The Swedish metal band Falconer released the song "Heresy in Disguise" in 2001, part of their Falconer album. The song is based on the novel.
 The British metal band Iron Maiden released the song "Sign of the Cross" in 1995, part of their X Factor album. The song refers to the novel.
 The British rock band Ten released the album The Name of the Rose (1996), whose eponymous track is loosely based around some of the philosophical concepts of the novel.
 Romanian composer Serban Nichifor released the poem Il nome della rosa for cello and piano 4 hands  (1989). The poem is based on the novel.

 Television 
 An eight-part miniseries adaptation, The Name of the Rose, commenced production in Italy in January 2018 and premiered on Rai 1 on March 4, 2019. The series was directed by Giacomo Battiato, and stars John Turturro as William of Baskerville, Rupert Everett as Gui, and newcomer Damian Hardung as Adso. The series premiered in the UK on BBC 2 on October 11, 2019.

 Errors 
Some historical errors present are most likely part of the literary artifice, whose contextualization is documented in the pages of the book preceding the Prologue, in which the author states that the manuscript on which the current Italian translation was later carried out contained interpolations due to different authors from the Middle Ages to the Modern era. Eco also personally reported some errors and anachronisms present in various editions of the novel until the revision of 2011:

 The novel mentions bell peppers, first in a recipe ("sheep meat with raw pepper sauce"), then in a dream of Adso, but it is an "impossible dish". These peppers were in fact imported from the Americas over a century and a half after the time in which the novel takes place. The same error is repeated later when Adso dreams of a reworking of the Coena Cypriani, in which among the different foods that guests bring to the table appear, in fact, also the peppers.
 During the seventh day-night, Jorge tells Guglielmo that Francis of Assisi "imitated with a piece of wood the movements of the player violin", an instrument that did not exist before the 16th century.
 At one point in the novel Adso claims to have done something in "a few seconds" when that time measure was not yet used in the Middle Ages.

Moreover, still present in the Note before the Prologue, in which Eco tries to place the liturgical and canonical hours:

If it is assumed, as logical, that Eco referred to the Local mean time, the estimate of the beginning of the hour before dawn and the beginning of Vespers (sunset), so those in the final lines ("dawn and sunset around 7.30 and 4.40 in the afternoon"), giving a duration from dawn to noon equal to or lower than that from noon to dusk, is the opposite of what happens at the end of November (it is a wrong application of the Equation of time).

 See also 

 Father Brown
 Historical mystery
 Roman de la Rose The Cadfael Chronicles Theological fiction

 References 

 Sources 
 
 
  
 
 

 External links 

 Umberto Eco discusses The Name of the Rose  on the BBC World Book Club''
 IMDb.com Listing: The Name of the Rose
 Filming location Kloster Eberbach, Germany
 The Name of the Rose by Umberto Eco, reviewed by Ted Gioia (Postmodern Mystery)
 New York Times Review

 
1980 novels
Books in semiotics
Historical crime novels
Italian novels adapted into films
Italian novels adapted into plays
Metafictional novels
Novels about religion
Novels adapted into video games
Novels by Umberto Eco
Novels set in Italy
Novels set in the 14th century
Novels set in the Middle Ages
Philosophical novels
Name of the Rose
Postmodern novels

1980 debut novels
20th-century Italian novels
Bompiani books
Catholicism in fiction
Clerical mysteries
Fiction set in the 1320s
Fictional libraries
Historical mystery
Historical mystery novels
Inquisition in fiction
Strega Prize-winning works
Works set in libraries
Works set in monasteries